is a football stadium in Maebashi, Gunma Prefecture, Japan.

It was one of the home stadium of football club Thespa Kusatsu in 2005.

See also
Shoda Shoyu Stadium Gunma (Gunma Shikishima Athletic Stadium)

References

External links

Football venues in Japan
Sports venues in Gunma Prefecture
Maebashi
1966 establishments in Japan
Sports venues completed in 1966
Thespakusatsu Gunma